Al-Nabi Jirjis Mosque was a historic religious complex consisting of a mosque and mausoleum located in Mosul, Iraq. The person buried in the mausoleum is believed to be that of Saint George, known by Muslim locals as Jirjis.

History 
The alleged tomb of Jirjis was located inside a Quraysh cemetery in Mosul.

In 1393, Tamerlane commissioned a mosque to be built at the site, and a dome over the alleged tomb of Jirjis. Several endowments, or waqf, were also organised to maintain the building.

In 1910, the structure was rebuilt after a major earthquake destroyed it completely.

Construction 
The mausoleum of Prophet Jirjis is a small square measuring 4.7 on each side. It is topped by a conical ribbed dome. The walls of the mausoleum are covered with green and yellow glazed brick tiles to the height of two meters, surmounted by a Quranic inscription band. Next to the mausoleum is a room measuring 4.17 by 4.46 meters with a central column to support the ceiling.

South of the mausoleum lies the mosque that was built by Tamerlane. A circular dome topped the mosque and the mihrab was transplanted from the original tomb into the mosque during construction. There are two prayer halls inside the shrine, one for the Sunni Hanafi rite and another for followers of the Sunni Shafi'i rite.

The minaret was added in 1853 and it is made out of stone. It features a muqarnas balcony topped with a pointed spire.

2014 demolition 
The Al-Nabi Jirjis Mosque was demolished by the Islamic State of Iraq and the Levant on 27 July 2014. The militants responsible claimed that the mosques had become places for apostasy and not prayer.

References 

Mosques in Mosul